Nina Li may refer to:

Nina Li Chi, Chinese actress currently married to Jet Li
Li Nina, Chinese aerial skier